1,4-Dichlorobut-2-ene is a chlorinated butene. It is an intermediate in the industrial production of chloroprene, and the main impurity in technical grade chloroprene. The (E)-isomer is also one of the starting materials for Birman's total synthesis of the poriferic natural product sceptrin.

Production of chloroprene
Chloroprene is a monomer for the production of synthetic rubbers such as Neoprene. It is produced from butadiene in a three-step process. The first step is the liquid- or vapour-phase chlorination of butadiene to a mixture of 3,4-dichlorobut-1-ene and 1,4-dichlorobut-2-ene (both isomers). In the second step, the mixture of 1,4-dichlorobut-2-ene and 3,4-dichlorobut-1-ene is isomerized to pure 3,4-dichlorobut-1-ene by heating to temperatures of 60–120 °C in the presence of a catalyst. Finally, dehydrochlorination (elimination of hydrogen chloride) of 3,4-dichlorobut-1-ene with dilute sodium hydroxide solution in the presence of polymerization inhibitors gives crude chloroprene.

References

Chloroalkenes